Mirocastnia is a genus of moths within the  family Castniidae.

Species
Mirocastnia canis (Lathy, 1923)
Mirocastnia pyrrhopygoides (Houlbert, 1917)
Mirocastnia smalli Miller, 1980

References

Castniidae